Christopher William C. Caird (born 26 May 1989) is an English basketball coach and former member of the Great Britain men's national basketball team.

College
Caird played college basketball for Drake University from 2013 to 2015.

Career
Caird first senior games came during the 2007-2008 season as a member of FSu Basket. He played for FSu until 2010 when he move to the United States to attend college. He returned to FSu in 2015 and averaged 19.4 points and 7.4 rebounds for the club during the 2015-2016 Úrvalsdeild season. However, a hip injury that required surgery cut his season short and he was unable to prevent FSu from being relegated back to Division I

After the season, Caird signed with Tindastóll. Despite being hobbled by injuries, he was named to the Úrvalsdeild All-first team for the first half of the 2016-2017 season. In January 2018 he was forced to retire as a player due to persistent knee injury and was subsequently hired as an assistant coach to Tindastóll men's basketball team.

In May 2018, Caird was hired as the head coach of Selfoss-Basket. On 22 November he returned to the court with Selfoss, playing 23 minutes and scoring 18 points against Höttur.

Awards, titles and accomplishments
Icelandic Basketball Cup: 2018

References

External links
Icelandic statistics at kki.is
Drake Bulldogs profile at godrakebulldogs.com
Marshalltown Profile at mccathletics.com
Profile at realgm.com

1989 births
Living people
British expatriate basketball people in the United States
British expatriate basketball people
British men's basketball players
Drake Bulldogs men's basketball players
English men's basketball players
Chris Caird
Chris Caird
Ungmennafélagið Tindastóll men's basketball players
Ungmennafélagið Tindastóll men's basketball coaches
Small forwards
Shooting guards